Eric Fairs is a former professional American football player who played linebacker for seven seasons for the Houston Oilers and Atlanta Falcons.

References

1964 births
American football linebackers
Houston Oilers players
Atlanta Falcons players
Memphis Tigers football players
Living people
People from Memphis, Tennessee